Aliaksandr Vashchyla (born 30 August 1981) is a male hammer thrower from Belarus, who is best known for winning the gold medal at the 2007 Summer Universiade. He set his personal best (80.12 metres) in the hammer throw event on 7 June 2008 in Minsk.

Achievements

References

trackfield.brinkster

1981 births
Living people
Belarusian male hammer throwers
Universiade medalists in athletics (track and field)
Universiade gold medalists for Belarus
Medalists at the 2007 Summer Universiade